Porthywaen Halt railway station was a station in Porth-y-waen, Shropshire, England, on the Tanat Valley Railway and the Potteries, Shrewsbury and North Wales Railway. The station opened in 1904 and closed in 1951. The short platform had a shelter and there was also signal box at the east end which controlled access to the quarry branches. Cambrian Heritage Railways has plans to re-open the station as part of its aim of reopening the line from Gobowen to Blodwel. The platform is still extant.

References

Further reading

Disused railway stations in Shropshire
Railway stations in Great Britain opened in 1904
Railway stations in Great Britain closed in 1951
Former Cambrian Railway stations